The 2011 Seoul mayoral by-election was held on 26 October 2011 after Oh Se-hoon resigned due to his failure in the Seoul Free Lunch Referendum. It was part of the by-elections in 2011.

Background 
As the controversy over the free school lunch program has not subsided, Mayor of Seoul Oh Se-hoon proposed a local referendum to the Seoul Metropolitan Council to directly ask the citizens' opinions regarding the free school lunch program. But the Metropolitan Council rejected his proposal, finally under the leadership of Mayor Oh, it decided to hold a local referendum on the scope of free school lunch, and the vote was scheduled to take place on 24 August 2011.

On 21 August, Mayor Oh announced three days before the referendum that he would step down if he lost because of unachievable voter turnout not achieved or low approval ratings after counting.

In the referendum held on 24 August, it was not able to count the votes because it was less than the minimum turnout rate of 33.3%. This has raised interest in the timing of Oh's resignation, because the by-election date will vary depending on his resignation date. If he resigns after 30 September 2011, the mayoral by-election will take with the legislative election on 11 April 2012. So the Grand National Party called for him to resign in October 2011. However, Mayor Oh announced his resignation on 26 August.

Selection of candidates

Grand National Party 
Na Kyung-won was the only candidate in the Grand National Party to run alone. Other candidates initially ran, but withdrew.

Pan-opposition 
The candidate who received the highest support in pan-opposition was Ahn Cheol-soo. However, he was on 6 September 2011, expressed its endorsement of Park Won-soon, a lawyer.

On 3 October 2011, pan-opposition primary were held to claimed unification of opposition candidates. In this primary, Park Won-soon was elected as the single candidate for the pan-opposition bloc by defeating Park Young-sun of the Democratic Party and Choi Kyu-youp of the Democratic Labor Party.

Final candidates 
 Na Kyung-won, member of the National Assembly. (Grand National Party)
 Bae Il-do, former member of the National Assembly. (Independent)
 Park Won-soon, a lawyer. (Independent)

Results

By district

References 

Seoul mayoral elections
October 2011 events in South Korea
2011 in South Korea
By-elections in South Korea